This is a list of the extreme points of China, compared both globally and within the country.

Global extreme points in China

Altitude
 The highest point on Earth measured from sea level is the summit of Mount Everest, Tibet Autonomous Region on the Sino-Nepal border.

Highest attainable by transportation
The following are all located partially or completely in the Tibet Autonomous Region.

Road (mountain pass): Possibly Semo La  , depending on definition of "attainable by transportation". There may be higher motorable passes in Tibet in areas affected by lack of information and restricted access. See Khardung La,  for more information.
Train: Tanggula Mountain Pass, in the Tanggula Mountains, on the Qinghai–Tibet border 
Airport: Daocheng Yading Airport, Sichuan province

Highest geographical features
The following are all located partially or completely in the Tibet Autonomous Region.

Remoteness

Country extreme points

Altitude 
 Maximum: Mount Everest, Tibet,  
 Minimal: Ayding Lake, Turfan Depression, Xinjiang,

Latitude and longitude

Continent

 North: Mohe County, Heilongjiang 
 South: Hai'an, Guangdong 
 East: Fuyuan County, Heilongjiang, on the west bank of the Ussuri River

Totality of the territory
 North: Mohe County, Heilongjiang 
 South: Hainan's southernmost tip (south-east of Sanya) is the undisputed southernmost point. James Shoal is the claimed southernmost point. Cuarteron Reef is the Chinese southernmost point with effective control.
 East: Fuyuan County, Heilongjiang, on the west bank of the Ussuri River

Railway stations 
 North: Mohe railway station, Heilongjiang 
 South: Old Sanya railway station, Hainan (abandoned) 
 West: Kashgar railway station, Xinjiang 
 East: Fuyuan railway station; On 19 December 2012, China extended rail service eastwards to Fuyuan, 17 hours northeast of Harbin.

Townships and villages
 West: considered to be Simhana (Simuhana) Village in Jigin (Jigen) Township, Ulugqat County (Wuqia), Kizilsu Kyrgyz Autonomous Prefecture, Xinjiang

See also 
Extreme points of Earth
Extreme points of Afro-Eurasia
Extreme points of Eurasia
Extreme points of Asia
 Geography of China
 Geographic Information Systems in China

References 

Geography of China
China
C